Duncanville High School is a secondary school located in Duncanville, Texas, United States, in the Dallas-Fort Worth area. The school is a part of Duncanville Independent School District.

The school includes grades 9 through 12. The high school campus is the second largest in the nation in terms of campus size. The district, and therefore the high school, serves almost all of the city of Duncanville, as well as portions of Cedar Hill, DeSoto, and a small portion of southwest Dallas.

For the 2018–2019 academic year, the school received a B grade from the Texas Education Agency.

History
Duncanville High School held its first accredited graduating class in 1936. Classes moved in 1954 to a new location, now Reed Middle School. Eleven years later, it moved to its current location. Construction started on Sandra Meadows Memorial Arena in 2003. A new classroom wing was added, along with major renovations, in 2004.

Campus
Duncanville High School is the second largest high school campus in the United States. The  campus is more than twice as large as the nearby Mountain View College, and it is over the size of four combined Wal-Mart Supercenters.

Extracurricular activities

Athletics
The school mascot is the Panther. With the exception of softball and girls track and field, the school has won state titles in every major team sport, including football.

The school's most notable success has been in girls' basketball, where it has won eleven state titles, including three consecutive from 1988 to 1990 while winning 134 consecutive games in the state's largest enrollment classification (a state record) before losing in the 1991 state semifinal. They also won 105 consecutive games and two consecutive state titles in 2012 and 2013. The girls teams were undefeated champions in 1989 (39-0), 1990 (37-0), 1997 (40-0), 2013 (42-0), and 2016 (39-0).

Basketball
Boys
1991, 1999, 2007, 2019, 2021

Girls
1976, 1988, 1989, 1990, 1997, 2003, 2012, 2013, 2016, 2017, 2020

Football
1998, 2022

Baseball
1975, 1976, 1990

Volleyball
1995

Track and field
Boys
1999

Soccer
Boys
1986

Girls
1987, 1990

Music programs
Duncanville is the only 6A band program in the history of the Texas Music Educators' Association Honor Band competition to win three State Honor Band titles (1999, 2005, 2009).

Choral Department
In 2022, the Duncanville High School Choral Department was named a 2022 GRAMMY Signature School and awarded a monetary grant for the excellence of the program under the leadership of Jesse Cannon II & De'Evin Johnson. In the same school year, the Assistant Choir Director, De'Evin Johnson was named a 2023 GRAMMY Music Educator Award Quarterfinalist.

The A Cappella Men's Choir has twice performed at the National American Choral Directors Association Conference those invited performances occurred in 2012 and 2021. In 2021 the A Capella Men's Choir was also named a Foundation for Music Education- Mark of Excellence National High School Winner in the Open Class.

Marching Band
The Duncanville High School Marching Band has been the UIL state champion in 1986, 1990, and 2002.

Journalism
The school is also known for its journalism program, which publishes the Panther Tale yearbook, Panther Prints newspaper, and the district's public relations publication, Class Magazine. The yearbook and newspaper have won numerous awards, including a Robert F. Kennedy Journalism Award and Gold and Silver Crown awards from the Columbia Scholastic Press Association. For the first time in 2002, Duncanville received a Gold Crown for its newspaper and its yearbook, one of only two high schools in the nation to capture both honors that year.

Controversies
A video of a student from Duncanville, 18-year-old sophomore Jeff Bliss scolding his social studies/history teacher, went viral in May 2013, and was picked up by media. CBS local news quoted the student:

The video was caught on video on a cellphone, posted on YouTube, and picked up by Reddit, PhillyD and Gawker. The official reaction of the Duncanville Independent School District was not to discipline the student, but to offer private and public reminders that there are other ways to make a point. The district issued a statement, saying, in part: "He makes a number of valid statements about how classrooms across America need to change, and we view this as an opportunity to have more conversations about transforming our schools to better meet the needs of our students."

A video of students protesting the school's strict dress code was sent to several of the local media outlets, who reported on the incident. The Duncanville Independent School District said about 170 students were found in violation of the school's dress code and sent home. The crackdown on students violating the dress code is what led to a spontaneous mass protest. Administrators responded to the protest with a large police presence on campus a day afterward, which remained until the last day of the school year.

Notable alumni

Greg Abbott, 48th Governor of Texas
Ariel Atkins, professional basketball player in the WNBA
Mike Bacsik, former MLB Pitcher
Brigetta Barrett, high jumper, Olympic silver medalist
Adam Butler, NFL player
Tamika Catchings, professional basketball player, 10-time WNBA All-Star, 4-time Olympic gold medalist
Keith Creel, MLB pitcher
Donald "Ray" Crockett, NFL player, cornerback with Denver Broncos
Tim DeLaughter, lead singer of Tripping Daisy and The Polyphonic Spree
Barry Foster, NFL running back
Tiffany Jackson, professional basketball player
Jill Marie Jones, professional actress and model
Perry Jones, current professional basketball player for Bursaspor of the Turkish Super League, and formerly the Oklahoma City Thunder
Jonathan Majors, actor
David Nied, former MLB pitcher (1992-1996)
Greg Ostertag, professional basketball player
Chris Owens, professional basketball player
Dashaun Phillips, professional American football player, a cornerback for the Redskins, Cowboys, Jets, and Steelers of the NFL and the Renegades of the XFL, played college football for the Tarleton State Texans
Todd Ritchie, MLB pitcher
Steven Romo, news anchor and writer working for NBC News
Priscilla Shirer, author and actress
Gene Summers, singer, Rockabilly Hall of Fame inductee, 1997

References
Associated Press. "Duncanville High builds fence to deter fights", Houston Chronicle, 23 January 2006. Retrieved 28 January 2006.

Notes

External links

Duncanville Independent School District

1935 establishments in Texas
Educational institutions established in 1935
Public high schools in Dallas County, Texas